Saint Titian may refer to:

St. Titian of Brescia, fifth century bishop
St. Titian of Oderzo, seventh century bishop